The acronym QTLS might refer to:
 Qualified Teacher Learning and Skills, an award for teachers
 quantitative trait locus, a section of DNA